Defender of the Faith (Latin: Fidei defensor, Fidei defensatrix; French: Défenseur de la Foi) is a phrase used as part of the full style of many English and later British monarchs and other monarchs and heads of state.

Defender of the Faith  or Defenders of the Faith may also refer to:

Arts and entertainment
Defenders of the Faith, a 1984 album by Judas Priest
Defender of the Faith (play), by Stuart Carolan
"Defender of the Faith", a short story by Philip Roth from the 1959 collection Goodbye, Columbus
Defenders of the Faith (Dungeons & Dragons), an optional rulebook for the game

Other uses
Defenders of the Faith (Puerto Rico), a Christian denomination
Ansar Dine (Arabic, 'defenders of the faith'), a militant Islamist group in Mali

See also
Nasir al-Din (disambiguation), Arabic for defender of the faith